Parnassus or Apollo and the Muses is a 1631–1633 painting by Nicolas Poussin, inspired by Raphael's Parnassus in the Stanza della Segnatura and now in the Prado Museum in Madrid. Among the figures depicted are Apollo and Homer. It was first mentioned in Spain in a 1746 inventory of the La Granja de San Ildefonso palace.

References

1633 paintings
Paintings of the Museo del Prado by French artists
Mythological paintings by Nicolas Poussin
Paintings of Apollo
Cultural depictions of Homer